is a 2005 live album by Japanese rock band GO!GO!7188.

Track listing
Disk 1
 Opening SE (オープニング SE)
 Akai Tsuki ni Hoeru Yoru (赤い月に吠える夜 A Night for Howling at the Red Moon)
 Umashika Mono (うましかもの Stupid Things)
 Violet no Sora (バイオレットの空 Violet Sky)
 Sen'nichikō (千日紅 Gomphrena)
 Otona no Kusuri (大人のくすり Adult Medicine)
 Koi no Dokuyaku (恋の毒薬 Love’s Drug)
 Yukue Fūmei (行方不明 Missing Person)
 Nanashi (ななし Untitled)
 Thundergirl (サンダーガール)
 Aoi Kiretsu (青い亀裂 Blue Crack)
 C7

Disk 2 
 Tokyo (東京)
 Futatsu no Ashioto (二つの足音 Two Footsteps)
 Umi no Uma (うみのうま Sea Horse)
 Kangaegoto (考え事 Thoughts)
 Shoshū (初秋 Early Autumn)
 Koi no Uta (こいのうた Love Song)
 Rock (ロック)
 Taxi (タクシー)
 Ukifune (浮舟) (A character and chapter title from The Tale of Genji)
 Otona no Himitsu (大人のひみつ The Secrets of Adults)
 Kunoichi (くのいち)
 Bungu (文具 Stationery)
 Tokage 3-gō (とかげ3号 Lizard #3)

GO!GO!7188 albums
2005 live albums